The Aprilia AF1 250 is a racing motorcycle, designed, developed, and built by Aprilia for the 250cc class in Grand Prix motorcycle racing, between 1985 and 1990. Loris Reggiani famously won the 1987 San Marino Grand Prix with this bike.

References

AF1 250
Grand Prix motorcycles
Two-stroke motorcycles